Sabas is a name derived from the Greek Savvas or Sabbas.

Sabas may refer to, chronologically:

Given name 
 Abda and Sabas, two early Christian martyrs and saints
 Julian Sabas (died 377), hermit who spent most of his life in deserted parts of Syria
 Sabas of Stoudios, Byzantine abbot who played a leading role at the Second Council of Nicaea
 Sabas Asidenos, local Byzantine magnate and independent ruler
 Sabás Magaña García (1921–1990), Mexican Roman Catholic bishop of the diocese of Matamoros
 Sabas Pretelt de la Vega (born 1946), Colombian economist, businessman, Colombian Minister of the Interior and Justice and ambassador convicted of corruption

Nickname
 Arvydas Sabonis (born 1964), Lithuanian retired basketball player nicknamed "Sabas"

Surname
 Juan Sabas (born 1967), Spanish former footballer
 Sylvie Sabas (born 1972), French former tennis player

See also
 Saba (given name)
 War of Saint Sabas (1256–1270), fought between Genoa and Venice

Masculine given names